Pseudobornia is a genus of plants known only from fossils found from the Upper Devonian.  It contains a single species Pseudobornia ursina, and is the earliest fossil assigned with certainty to the Equisetopsida.

The first fossils of Pseudobornia were collected by Johan Gunnar Andersson on Bear Island in the 1890s.  Hans-Joachim Schweitzer, a paleobotanist, was the first to interpret the fossils as belonging to a large tree, based on additional fossils discovered in Alaska in the 1960s.

The probable relationships within Equisetidae are shown in the cladogram below.  The position where Ibyka would be has been added.

References

Horsetails
Late Devonian plants
Prehistoric plant genera
Late Devonian first appearances
Late Devonian genus extinctions
Prehistoric plants of North America